Sphaeronectes is a genus of cnidarians belonging to the family Sphaeronectidae.

The genus has almost cosmopolitan distribution.

Species:

Sphaeronectes bougisi 
Sphaeronectes brevitruncata 
Sphaeronectes christiansonae 
Sphaeronectes fragilis 
Sphaeronectes gamulini 
Sphaeronectes haddocki 
Sphaeronectes irregularis 
Sphaeronectes koellikeri 
Sphaeronectes pagesi 
Sphaeronectes pughi 
Sphaeronectes tasmanica 
Sphaeronectes tiburonae

References

Sphaeronectidae
Hydrozoan genera